Catharina Mulder (25 March 1723, in Rotterdam – 29 June 1798, in Rotterdam), also known as Kaat Mossel , was a Dutch orangist. She was a fishmonger, selling mussels in Rotterdam, hence her nickname: Kaat Mossel = Cate Mussel. She led and organised the orangist riots in Rotterdam in 1784 against the patriots. She is regarded as a representative of the common orangism.

References
 http://www.historici.nl/Onderzoek/Projecten/DVN/lemmata/data/Mulder
 Johanna Breevoort, Kaat Mossel. Tooneelen uit het leven van een Rotterdamsche Oranjeklante. Voor ons volk geschetst (Rotterdam 1913).
 Kees van Baardewijk, Kaat, Keet en de Kezen. Rotterdamse vrouwen in opstand (Wezep 1991; 2de dr.).
 Eric Palmen, ‘Oranjebitter. De smalle gemeente van Rotterdam in de partijstrijd tussen de patriotten en de orangisten’, Rotterdams Jaarboekje (1994) 243-261.
 R.M. Dekker, ‘Kaat Mossel. De verpersoonlijking van de Oranjeliefde’, in: H.M. Beliën e.a. red., Nederlanders van het eerste uur. Het ontstaan van het moderne Nederland 1780-1830 (Amsterdam 1996) 41-49.
 Eric Palmen, Kaat Mossel, helleveeg van Rotterdam. Volk en verlichting in de achttiende eeuw (Amsterdam 2009).

1723 births
1798 deaths
18th-century Dutch women
Dutch Orangists
Writers from Rotterdam